Lim Heng Chek (1936 – 15 May 2021) was a Malaysian swimmer. He competed in the men's 100 metre backstroke at the 1956 Summer Olympics.

References

External links
 

1936 births
2021 deaths
Malaysian male swimmers
Olympic swimmers of Malaya
Swimmers at the 1956 Summer Olympics
Commonwealth Games competitors for Malaya
Swimmers at the 1962 British Empire and Commonwealth Games
Place of birth missing
Swimmers at the 1962 Asian Games
Southeast Asian Games medalists in swimming
Southeast Asian Games gold medalists for Malaysia
Southeast Asian Games silver medalists for Malaysia
Competitors at the 1959 Southeast Asian Peninsular Games
Competitors at the 1961 Southeast Asian Peninsular Games
Asian Games competitors for Malaysia
People from Petaling Jaya
20th-century Malaysian people